Donn E. Pohren (1929–2007) was an American guitarist and historian. He is known for his three major texts on flamenco: The Art of Flamenco (1962), Lives and Legends of Flamenco: A Biographical History (1964), and A Way of Life (1980). He is the only non-Spaniard to receive the title of flamencologist by the Catedra de Flamencologia. Hailing from Minneapolis, he moved to Seville, married the dancer Luisa Maravilla, had a daughter, and completed a university degree in Madrid. He states that "in the beginning I used to say my mother was Spanish, and call myself Daniel Maravilla, which did help in getting accepted."

References

Flamenco
Flamenco guitarists
American music historians
American male non-fiction writers
Musicians from Minneapolis
Guitarists from Minnesota
American male guitarists
1929 births
2007 deaths
20th-century guitarists
20th-century American male musicians
Historians from Minnesota